The Seeds of Doom is the sixth and final serial of the 13th season of the British science fiction television series Doctor Who, which was first broadcast in six weekly parts on BBC1 from 31 January to 6 March 1976.

In the serial, the Fourth Doctor (Tom Baker) agrees to go on one final mission in his role as UNIT's scientific advisor to investigate a mysterious pod found in the Antarctic. However, the crazed millionaire and plant collector Harrison Chase (Tony Beckley) is also interested, and has sent his violent henchman Scorby (John Challis) and the botanist Arnold Keeler (Mark Jones) to acquire the malignant alien plant for his personal collection.

Plot

In Antarctica, British scientists Charles Winlett and Derek Moberley discover a pod buried in the permafrost and take it back to their camp. John Stevenson, the base botanist, identifies it as vegetable-based and estimates it has been buried in the ice for twenty thousand years.

In London, Richard Dunbar of the World Ecology Bureau shows the Fourth Doctor photographs of the pod at the urging of his superior, Sir Colin Thackeray. The Doctor believes it to be extraterrestrial. He tells Dunbar to tell the expedition not to touch it until he arrives.

Back at the base, Stevenson discovers that the pod is growing larger and he believes it is absorbing ultraviolet radiation. In England, Dunbar visits the estate of millionaire Harrison Chase, who considers it his mission to protect the plant life of Mother Earth. Dunbar gives Chase the location of the pod. Chase sends his men, Scorby and Keeler, to retrieve it.

At the base, the pod opens and stings Winlett. When Stevenson and Moberley find him, Winlett's face is covered with green hives. The Doctor and Sarah arrive and find that Winlett's face and body are rapidly becoming covered with green fungus. Outside the base, the Doctor uncovers another pod and notes that they travel in pairs. Winlett's blood is found to contain no blood platelets, but instead has schizophytes – microscopic organisms akin to plant bacteria.  The Doctor tells Sarah that Winlett is turning into a Krynoid, a galactic weed that settles on planets and eats the animal life. Scorby and Keeler arrive, claiming that their private plane got lost.

Moberley is killed by Winlett. Transformed into a Krynoid, Winlett flees the base and shelters in the outside generator hut. Scorby and Keeler steal the remaining pod then escape in their plane. The Doctor and the others are attacked by the Krynoid, which kills Stevenson. The Doctor and Sarah flee as a bomb set by Scorby and Keeler destroys the area.  The Doctor and Sarah are picked up by a team from South Bend, while Scorby and Keeler return to Chase in England with the second pod. Dunbar warns Chase that the Doctor and Sarah are still alive and are scheduled to meet with him and Sir Colin in two hours.

At the meeting, the Doctor and Sarah describe the theft of the pod. He tells Dunbar to arrange for him to go to the Botanic Institute. As they leave a driver meets them. However, the limousine stops in the countryside, and the driver orders them out at gunpoint. The Doctor jumps the driver and punches him out. The Doctor and Sarah search the car and find a painting by Amelia Ducat, a flower artist. When they visit her, Ducat tells them that the owner of the painting is Harrison Chase, who never paid her for it.

Chase orders Keeler to inject the pod with fixed nitrogen. When the Doctor and Sarah try to sneak into the mansion, they are captured and brought before Chase, who decides to show them around the mansion and his plant laboratory before he executes them.  When Scorby escorts the Doctor and Sarah into the gardens to kill them, they overpower him. Sarah escapes but is captured again. The Doctor rescues her and in the confusion, a frond from the pod stings Keeler's arm. Keeler soon begins to transform.

When the Doctor returns to the laboratory, he is captured and taken to the compost room, where Scorby activates the crusher. Sarah escapes back to the house, attracts Ducat's attention and asks him to take a message to Sir Colin. Outside, Ducat enters a car with Sir Colin and Dunbar inside and tells them what Sarah said. Dunbar, realising he has made a terrible mistake, says he will get the Doctor. He tells Sir Colin that, if he does not return in half an hour, to return to London and call UNIT.

Sarah turns off the crusher in time to save the Doctor. Hargreaves finds that Keeler has almost completed his transformation and runs in a panic as the creature frees itself. In the mansion, Dunbar pleads with Chase to abandon the experiment as Hargreaves reports Keeler's transformation to Chase. Dunbar goes to get help and is pursued by Scorby.

The Doctor realises that Keeler is missing, and goes with Sarah to search for the Krynoid. Dunbar runs into the monster and is killed. His screams attract the attention of Scorby, the guards and the Doctor and Sarah. They escape to a cottage and barricade themselves in. The Krynoid speaks using Keeler's voice, demanding that the Doctor join it and it will spare the others. Scorby throws a Molotov cocktail at the Krynoid, allowing the Doctor to escape. Chase makes his way through the grounds and confronts the Krynoid. It notices him and he approaches, taking photographs.

The Doctor arrives at the Bureau, where UNIT Major Beresford warns he can't do anything without evidence. The Doctor shows reports of people near Chase's estates being killed by plants. He then calls Sarah and tells them Beresford is preparing to attack the Krynoid with a laser gun, but the Krynoid cuts the phone wires. Chase arrives and tells them that it's the plants' world, and humans are parasites. He goes to the manor to develop his photographs then begins speaking to the plants in his greenhouse.

Scorby, Sarah, and Hargreaves confront Chase, and he speaks of how the world will be made perfect. Sarah notices that the plants are closing in on them. The Doctor and a UNIT soldier drive onto the grounds while the plants overwhelm Sarah and the others and start to strangle them.

The Doctor and UNIT Sgt. Henderson arrive with chemical plant-killer. They dispose of the plants, saving Scorby and Sarah, but Hargreaves is killed. Chase runs away, and the Doctor and the others go into the lab and start removing the plants. Once they're outside, Chase locks the door behind them and they watch as the now enormous Krynoid towers over them. UNIT soldiers arrive and open fire with their laser gun, distracting the Krynoid so that the Doctor and his group can get to another door.

After they leave, Chase slips back into the laboratory and destroys the loudspeaker system. The others return to the laboratory, and the Krynoid tries to break in. Chase puts Henderson in the compost machine and activates it, killing him.

The Doctor works to repair the loudspeaker system as the Krynoid renews its attack, and Scorby panics and runs. He makes his way across a pond, but the plants grab and pull him underwater, killing him.

The Doctor and Sarah realise that Henderson is gone, and Sarah goes to look for him. She makes her way to the compost machine room, and Chase confronts her, telling her he's become part of the plant world thanks to the Krynoid. Chase plans to support the Krynoid and refers to humanity as parasites, then attacks Sarah and knocks her unconscious.

Beresford contacts the Doctor, who warns they have 15 minutes until the Krynoid germinates, spreading its seeds across England. The Doctor tells them to launch an air strike before it's too late.

Chase has tied up Sarah and starts feeding her into the compost machine. The Doctor arrives and shuts it off. In the ensuing struggle, Sarah is saved, but Chase is pulled into the machine.

The RAF launches a sighting run as Beresford and Sir Colin look for the Doctor. Sarah and the Doctor cannot get out through the plant life covering the house, but the Doctor rigs a steam pipe and they blast their way out. They make their way through the hostile plant life and take refuge as the RAF opens fire and destroys the Krynoid and the mansion.

Outside references

Scorby quotes Voltaire's line "when it is a question of money, everybody is of the same religion", but the Doctor seems to attribute it to Franklin Pierce Adams.

Production

Writing
The serial was written by established television writer Robert Banks Stewart, who was influenced in the writing of this ecological tale of rampant flora by his home abutting Kew Gardens as well as his familial connection to botanist Joseph Banks. The Doctor's dialogue with Amelia Ducat about the car boot and model is an homage to Oscar Wilde's The Importance of Being Earnest.

Filming
Location shooting took place at Athelhampton Hall in Dorset for the scenes at Harrison Chase's estate, while the Antarctica scenes were filmed in a quarry in Buckland, Surrey. BBC Television Centre in White City, London served as the location for the World Ecology Centre.

This is the third of four serials of the programme to have all of its exterior location scenes shot on Outside Broadcast (OB) videotape rather than film before the official switchover in 1986; the previous two were Robot (1974) and The Sontaran Experiment (1975), and later The Stones of Blood (1978). On 7 December 1975, whilst location filming the closing scene outside the TARDIS at Buckland, the TARDIS prop collapsed on Elisabeth Sladen; it was the original prop used since 1963.

After a long association with Doctor Who, this was the last story to be directed by Douglas Camfield.

Casting notes
None of the established UNIT characters are seen in this story (this would be the last regular appearance of the organisation), as Nicholas Courtney was unavailable to reprise the role of Brigadier Lethbridge-Stewart.

Broadcast and reception

The Seeds of Doom was one of the Doctor Who serials which drew criticism from Mary Whitehouse for violent imagery. She wrote, "Strangulation – by hand, by claw, by obscene vegetable matter – is the latest gimmick, sufficiently close up so they get the point. And just for a little variety show the children how to make a Molotov Cocktail."

In The Discontinuity Guide, Paul Cornell, Martin Day, and Keith Topping described the serial as "an Avengers episode in disguise" and called it "another gem, and one much benefitting from an excellent performance from Tony Beckley as Harrison Chase". In The Television Companion (1998), David J. Howe and Stephen James Walker praised how the story was split between two settings and the monster in general, though they felt some aspects of the Krynoid were "rubbish". They wrote that the only real disappointment was UNIT, which contained none of the old characters and as a result "[came] across as a faceless and characterless bunch whose sole function in the story is to resolve the situation".

In 2010, Mark Braxton of Radio Times awarded it five stars out of five, describing The Seeds of Doom as "a rich, classy serving, with plenty of meat accompanying the vegetables" and arguing that "the archive-raiding of the Holmes/Hinchcliffe era reaches its zenith here." He praised Baker, the guest actors and their characters. However, he acknowledged that it was "an abnormally violent outing" and believed that the plot contained a "giant crevasse" in that "it takes a ridiculous amount of time for the Doctor et al to know how to tackle the Keeler-Krynoid, having seemingly forgotten that the Winlett-Krynoid was killed by an explosion". The A.V. Club reviewer Christopher Bahn said that the serial was "one of the greats" of the era, particularly praising the pacing and Baker's performance.

DVD Talk's Ian Jane gave The Seeds of Doom four out of five stars, calling the script "a good one". Ian Berriman of SFX gave the story five out of five stars, writing, "Often bleakly grotesque, blessed with an eerie, mournful score and shot with real brio, this is a rare Who six-parter that you can consume in one sitting, with nary a moment of boredom." He also was positive towards the performances of Beckley and Baker. In 2018, The Daily Telegraph ranked The Seeds of Doom at number 14 in "the 56 greatest stories and episodes", arguing that it was "probably the high-water mark of the series as an action adventure programme" and "the closest it ever got to a Bond movie", with an "interesting concept, good direction, memorable performances, action and adventure".

Commercial releases

In print

A novelisation of this serial, written by Philip Hinchcliffe, was published by Target Books in February 1977. A slightly "Americanized" version of Hinchcliffe's novel was released as #10 in the Pinnacle Books series in March 1980 with a foreword by Harlan Ellison and a cover illustration by David Mann.  An audiobook of the Target novelisation was released on 5 September 2019 by BBC Audio, read by Michael Kilgarriff.

Home media
The Seeds of Doom was released on a double VHS in 1994 in the United Kingdom. In North America it was released as a single VHS. The story was released on DVD on 25 October 2010 in the United Kingdom, and on 8 March 2011 in the United States. Music from this serial was released on the CD Doctor Who: Terror of the Zygons. This serial was also released as part of the Doctor Who DVD Files in Issue 120 on 7 August 2013.

Soundtrack

References

External links

BBC Assistant Floor Manager Susan Shearman talks about working on The Seeds of Doom (archive from 5 November 2010, accessed 12 March 2017)

Target novelisation

Doctor Who serials novelised by Philip Hinchcliffe
Television episodes set in Antarctica
Fourth Doctor serials
1976 British television episodes
UNIT serials